Abel Villanueva (born 1981) is a Peruvian long distance runner who specialises in the marathon. He competed in the marathon event at the 2015 World Championships in Athletics in Beijing, China.

References

External links

1981 births
Living people
Peruvian male long-distance runners
Peruvian male marathon runners
World Athletics Championships athletes for Peru
Place of birth missing (living people)